No Time To Burn is the second album by funk group Black Heat.

Reception

Released in 1974.  Produced by Joel Dorn and Jimmy Douglass.

Track listing
No Time To Burn 	3:43 	
You Should've Listened 	5:34 	
Check It All Out 	6:58 	
Love The Life You Live 	6:33 	
Super Cool 	3:58 	
M & M's 	6:53 	
Things Change 	5:02 	
Rapid Fire 	1:33 	
Times Have Changed 	5:39

Personnel
Johnell Gray - Keyboards, Vocals
Naamon Jones - Bass, Vocals
Bradley Owens - Guitar, Vocals
Esco Cromer - Drums, Percussion, Vocals
Rodney Edwards - Trumpet, Timbales
Ray Thompson - Saxophone, Flute, Woodwind
Raymond Green - Congas, Percussion, Vocals

Charts

Singles

References

External links
 Black Heat-No Time To Burn at Discogs

1974 albums
Atlantic Records albums